Novosad is a surname. Notable people with the surname include:

 Anastasiya Novosad (born 1993), Ukrainian skier
 Hanna Novosad (born 1990), Ukrainian politician
 Lubomír Novosad, Slovak volleyball player
 Lukáš Novosad (born 1976), Czech canoeist
 Petr Novosad (born 1975), Czech footballer

See also
 

Czech-language surnames
Slovak-language surnames
Ukrainian-language surnames